Maciej Słomczyński (April 10, 1922 – March 21, 1998) was a Polish translator and writer. For his detective stories he used the pen names Joe Alex and Kazimierz Kwaśniewski.

Life and work
Born in Warsaw, he was the son of Merian C. Cooper, an American aviator, American Air Force and Polish Air Force officer, adventurer, and the screenwriter, director and producer of the film King Kong. His mother was an Englishwoman, Marjorie Słomczyńska née Crosby (1884–1954). He adopted his last name, Słomczyński, after his stepfather, Aleksander Słomczyński, who married Marjorie after she had not agreed to leave for the United States with Cooper. However, the fatherhood of Cooper has been questioned, among others, by his family.

In 1941, he joined the Polish resistance organization Confederation of the Nation and in 1943 the Polish Home Army. In 1944 he was arrested and imprisoned in Pawiak, from which he managed to escape. Later he moved West and served in the American Gendarmerie in France.

He debuted as a poet in 1946 in the "Tydzień" magazine in Łódź. In 1947 he returned to Poland and seven years later he moved permanently to Kraków.

After the war he was persecuted and questioned as a suspected British spy. For a few months in 1953 he worked for the State Security and he fled to Gdańsk to break the contact with the agency. Later, he persistently refused to cooperate.

He is the author of the 1957 novel "Cassiopeia", in which he presented the attitudes of the artistic circles towards communism and the reasons, which made a great part of these circles to serve the new government.

He translated Ulysses and Gulliver's Travels into Polish; he was the only person in the world to translate all the works of William Shakespeare. His translations of Shakespeare were, however, subjected to critique for the lack of clarity, faithfulness to the original or any literary value.

He was the member of the Stowarzyszenie Pisarzy Polskich and Rotary Club, as well as the vice-president of the international association "The James Joyce Foundation", and since 1973, a member of the Irish Institute.

Joe Alex and Kazimierz Kwaśniewski 

Słomczyński was the author of crime fiction published under the pen names Joe Alex (or Józef Aleks) and Kazimierz Kwaśniewski. As Joe Alex he authored film scripts, stage plays and TV plays, in particular, for the TV . Alex's crime fiction was translated into 13 languages: Belarusian, Bulgarian, Czech, Lithuanian, Latvian, German, Russian, Romanian, Serbo-Croatian, Slovak, Slovene, Ukrainian and Hungarian. Most of his books in the USSR were published without his permission or without the permission of his descendants.

Bibliography

As Maciej Słomczyński:
Lądujemy 6 czerwca
Zadanie porucznika Kenta
Fabryka śmierci
Szary cień

As Joe Alex:
Śmierć mówi w moim imieniu
Cichym ścigałam go lotem
Gdzie przykazań brak dziesięciu
Niechaj odnajdą swoich wrogów
Zmącony spokój Pani Labiryntu
Cicha jak ostatnie tchnienie
Jesteś tylko diabłem
Piekło jest we mnie
Powiem wam jak zginął
Czarne okręty

As Kazimierz Kwaśniewski:
Śmierć i Kowalski
Zbrodniarz i panna
Każę aktorom powtórzyć morderstwo
Gdzie jest trzeci król?
Ciemna jaskinia
Czarny Kwiat

References

English–Polish translators
Polish translators
Polish male writers
Polish crime writers
Polish crime fiction writers
Translators from English
Translators of William Shakespeare
1922 births
1998 deaths
Writers from Warsaw
People from Warsaw Voivodeship (1919–1939)
Polish people of American descent
Burials at Rakowicki Cemetery
20th-century translators
20th-century poets
20th-century Polish writers
Polish people of English descent